Sunningdale Garden is a Home Ownership Scheme and Private Sector Participation Scheme court built on reclaimed land in Sheung Shui, New Territories, Hong Kong near Tin Ping Estate, Sheung Shui Town Centre and Shek Wu Hui. It has a total of two blocks built in 1992.

Houses

Politics
Sunningdale Garden is located in Shek Wu Hui constituency of the North District Council. It was formerly represented by Lam Cheuk-ting, who was elected in the 2019 elections until March 2021.

See also

Public housing estates in Sheung Shui

References

Residential buildings completed in 1992
Sheung Shui
Home Ownership Scheme
Private Sector Participation Scheme